Paramastus is a genus of gastropods belonging to the family Enidae.

The species of this genus are found in East Mediterranean and Black Sea.

Species:

Paramastus cyprius 
Paramastus dernensis 
Paramastus edentatus 
Paramastus episomus 
Paramastus forcarti 
Paramastus gaillyi 
Paramastus hedjazicus 
Paramastus kaltenbachi 
Paramastus sabaeanus

References

Enidae